Dmitry Arkadievich Mazepin (born April 18, 1968 in Minsk, Byelorussian SSR, Soviet Union) is a Belarusian-Russian oligarch businessman. He is former owner and former CEO Uralchem. As of March 2022, following Russia's invasion of Ukraine, Dmitry Mazepin has been sanctioned by the European Union and the United Kingdom.

Forbes magazine placed for the first time Mazepin on the list of Russia's 100 wealthiest businessmen in 2010, estimating his personal fortune at US$950 million. Later, he was repeatedly included in this list: in 2011 (67th place and $1.5 billion), 2012 (56th place and $1.7 billion), 2013 (33rd place and $3.2 billion), 2014 (74th and 1.4 billion dollars), 2015 (63rd place and 1.3 billion dollars). In 2021, according to Forbes, Dmitry Mazepin's fortune amounted to $800 million, and he took 150th place in the ranking of the "200 richest businessmen in Russia".

Early life and education 
Dmitry Mazepin was born on April 18, 1968 in Minsk, graduating from the Suvorov Military Academy in Minsk in 1985. He then served as a military interpreter in Afghanistan between 1986 and 1988.

He graduated from the MGIMO University's Department of Economics in 1992 before going to work in the financial sector of Russia and Belarus and ultimately taking executive positions at major Russian private and government-owned companies Nizhnevartovskneftegaz and Sibur.

He graduated from the Saint Petersburg Institute for Economics and Management in 2008 with a first-tier university degree in Organization Management. He earned his PhD from the same school in 2012 after defending a thesis on developing a methodical approach to managing the stock market potential of an oil producing company.

Business career

Early beginnings (1992–2002) 
Mazepin was the CEO of Infistrakh, an insurance company, from 1992 to 1993. For two years afterwards he held the deputy branch manager position at Belarusbank, before holding several executive positions at Falkon Bank in 1995. His first major corporate assignment came in 1997 as well, with his appointment to the Vice-President position of TNK, the Tymen Oil Company. The company had just acquired Nizhnevartovskneftegaz as a subsidiary and Mazepin was made its Executive Director in charge of making the firm profitable again. According to an interview in 2009, Mazepin ultimately succeeded in making Nizhnevartovskneftegaz loss-free.

Major appointments (2003–present) 
Mazepin was the president of Sibur, a subsidiary of major gas producer Gazprom, in 2002 and held the position until 2003. He was invited to take up the position to replace Jacob Goldovsky, who was arrested for illegally removing assets belonging to Gazprom from the company. Mazepin was tasked to return these assets under Gazprom's operational control, as well as stabilize the at the time deeply indebted business. The company underwent extensive technical audits to restart idle capacity and several issues relating to worker welfare, including pay arrears and housing conditions, were resolved. Mazepin also sought to diversify Sibur's revenue sources, signing a MOU on gas processing with Sibneft in 2003.

In 2004, Mazepin created his own company in the sector after leaving Sibur. Constructive Bureau, a company controlled by Mazepin, acquired a majority stake in Kirovo-Chepetsk Chemicals Plant in a public auction, outbidding Gazprom. Mazepin became chairman of the board of the plant in 2005. Constructive Bureau later also acquired stakes in Perm-based joint-stock companies Halogen and Minudobrenia, Berezniki Azot and Volgograd-based Khimprom (transferred to Renova in 2006).

Uralchem and Uralkali 
In 2007, all assets under Mazepin's control were combined to form Uralchem United Chemicals Company, a public joint-stock company and Mazepin became the Chairman of the Board of Director of Uralchem.

In June 2008, Mazepin acquired a 75.01% stake in Voskresensk Mineral Fertilizers, increasing this stake to 100% in 2011. In the same year, he combined the production facilities of Kirov-Chepetsk Plant and Perm Halogen into Halopolymer, a public joint-stock company. He resigned from the Board of Directors of Halopolymer in 2015. The main production assets of the company include the Azot branch in Berezniki, the Perm Mineral Fertilizers branch in Perm, the Kirovo-Chepetsk Chemical Plant branch in Kirovo-Chepetsk, and Voskresensk Mineral Fertilizers in the Moscow region.

in December 2013, Mazepin acquired a 20% stake in the world's largest potash producer, Uralkali, in a deal that was estimated to be worth $2.9 billion. The acquisition was financed with a $4.5 billion loan from VTB. A month before, Mikhail Prokhorov had also bought a 21.75% stake in the company from Suleiman Kerimov. Mazepin took operating control over the company at that time, winning a seat on Uralkali Board of Directors in March. Since 2014, he has also been the Deputy Chairman of the Board of Directors of Uralkali.

As part of a business development strategy, Mazepin has sought to introduce both companies to African markets. Both Uralchem and Uralkali have been in talks with several African countries to increase production and build new plants on the continent. In December 2018, Mazepin met with Kenya's President Uhuru Kenyatta to discuss new business deals as relations between Russia and Kenya are improving.

Mazepin met with Zimbabwe's President Emmerson Mnangagwa and Zambia’s President Edgar Lungu, in 2018. Zimbabwe and Zambia are planned to become important hubs for fertilizer production as global demand is set to rise. Mazepin also met with Angola’s president João Lourenço in March 2019 to discuss the possible construction of a urea plant in the country that would have a capacity of 1 million tonnes per year. During the Russia-Africa International Forum held in October 2019, Mazepin met with Emmerson Mnangagwa and Mozambique’s President Filipe Jacinto Newsy. This was to reaffirm Uralchem’s interest in investing in mineral fertilizer production in Zimbabwe, seeing that it is already supplying fertilizers to Zimbabwe, Zambia, Kenya and Angola, and is starting deliveries to Mozambique.

In March 2022, Dmitry Mazepin reduced his stake in Uralchem below the control one and resigned as CEO of the company.

Philanthropy 

Forbes listed Mazepin as one of the most charitable Russian billionaires in 2013.

According to Forbes and Ria Novosti, Mazepin spent $700,000 on charitable causes in 2012, most of it on a project that is buying cars for large low-income families in the Kirov region.

Through Uralchem, Mazepin is involved in several charitable activities, including social programs for children and veterans, regional development initiatives, education and science programs, activities for promoting culture and sports.

Social activities

Mazepin holds several business related international memberships. He is member of the Bureau of the RSPP Board (The Russian Union of Industrialists and Entrepreneurs, RSPP) and Chairman of the Commission on Mineral Fertilizers Production and Trading of RSPP.

He is also Chairman of the Russia-Zimbabwe Business Council (The Chamber of Commerce and Industry of the Russian Federation) as well as Chairman of the Russia-Belarus Business Council.

Controversies and criticism 
Mazepin was accused of conflicts of interest during his stint at the Russian Government Property Fund, as he was also on the board of several enterprises at the time, including Krasnoye Sormovo Shipyard and Kuzbassugol Coal Company, which he allegedly privileged in corporate disputes with competitors. As a result, nothing was proved and the accusations remained in the public field.

In the mid-2000s, Dmitry Mazepin became embroiled in a conflict around Gazprom assets. The assets were divested by Nikolay Gornovsky, CEO of Gazprom subsidiary Mezhregiongaz, in late 2002, without permission or knowledge of the Gazprom management. Part of these assets ended up in Mazepin's possession some time after that. In 2006, Gazprom was able to recover the assets, including an 18% equity stake in Azot Chemicals Company.

Starting from 2007, Mazepin has been regularly accused of attempting to use "raider methods" to take over Togliattiazot (TOAZ), a public company where he has been consistently persecuting the executives. TOAZ CEO Sergey Makhlai accused Mazepin of making personal threats against himself. According to Makhlai, Mazepin threatened him with instigating a criminal investigation against him unless he agreed to Mazepin's terms for selling TOAZ to Mazepin. As of 2022, the accusations against Mazepin have not been proven. 

Since Uralchem became a minority shareholder of TOAZ with a 7.5% stake in 2008, the company leadership has accused the Makhlai family of large-scale fraud involving selling its product, primarily ammonia and urea, to a foreign distributor at below market prices. According to Russian investigations, the scheme allegedly took place between 2008 and 2011 and involved Swiss-based Nitrochem Distribution AG, which bought the product at low prices before selling it on at market value. Investigators estimated that Uralchem had sustained up to $500 million worth of damage as a consequence.

Although Sergey and Vladimir Makhlai denied these accusations, they were in July 2019 sentenced in absentia to prison terms, along with their collaborators, Togliattiazot's former CEO Evgeny Korolev and their Swiss partners Andreas Zivy and Beat Ruprecht. The court also sentenced them to pay a compensation of 10 billion rubles to Uralchem and 77 billion rubles to Togliattiazot.

A 2014 news story published in Russian daily Izvestia claimed that Mazepin planned to acquire Odessa Port Plant, a major Ukrainian chemical asset. Mazepin has denied that he or Uralchem harbor any interest in the asset.

Uralkali made a buyback offer for 14% of its stock in May 2015. Market observers speculated at the time that the buyback would make it easier for Mazepin to merge Uralkali and Uralchem, which would make Mazepin the largest shareholder.

Mazepin and Uralkali made a bid for the Force India Formula One team following its fall into administration in July 2018. Having lost out to a Canadian consortium led by Lawrence Stroll, Mazepin openly criticized the bidding process having allegedly never been contacted by the administrators over his bid.

Mazepin and his son Nikita Mazepin were added to a European Union list of sanctions, following the Russian invasion of Ukraine. On 24 February 2022, Mazepin attended a general meeting of representatives of Russian business and President Vladimir Putin.

On March 11, 2022, Dmitry Mazepin sold a controlling stake in Uralchem and stepped down as its chief executive officer. On March 15, the United Kingdom has followed the EU's lead and added Dmitry and Nikita Mazepin to the UK official sanctions list. On April 11, Italian police seized properties belonging to Mazepin worth 105 million euros as part of the sanctions.

Awards 
Mazepin is a recipient of a Honorary Certificate from the Russian Government, and received the military's  Medal "For Courage" (Russia) and Medal "For Service in Battle".

Personal life 
Mazepin is divorced, and he is a father of two children  - Nikita Mazepin and Anastasia Mazepina. Nikita is a racing driver who was competing in Formula One for the Haas F1 Team on a multi-year deal until his contract was cancelled after Russia’s invasion of Ukraine.

References 

Russian oligarchs
1968 births
Businesspeople from Minsk
Russian billionaires
Living people
Formula One people
Russian people of Belarusian descent
Russian individuals subject to European Union sanctions
Minsk Suvorov Military School alumni